Randell Thomas McDonnell or Randall Thomas Macdonnell (21 August 1843 – 12 April 1923) was a New Zealand cricketer. He played eight matches of first-class cricket for Canterbury and Otago between 1864 and 1876.

Life
McDonnell was born in London into a prominent Irish family. He entered the Royal Navy and served on HMS Excellent before moving to New Zealand in the 1860s. He served in the Customs Department, first at Lyttelton and then for many years at Port Chalmers, where he was in charge of the port's customs and immigration.

He died in Dunedin in April 1923, survived by his wife and their two daughters.

Cricket career
Batting at No. 3, McDonnell was Otago's highest scorer against Canterbury in 1868-69, with 29 and 24. A season later, now at No. 4, he was the highest scorer in the match on either side when he scored 32 in Otago's second innings. He gave five chances before he was finally out, and Otago went on to win by four wickets.

McDonnell also umpired one first-class match in 1879 as well as the matches between Canterbury and the touring English team in 1882 and between Otago and the touring Australians in 1886.

See also
 List of Otago representative cricketers

References

External links
 

1843 births
1923 deaths
New Zealand cricketers
Canterbury cricketers
Otago cricketers
New Zealand cricket umpires
People from St Pancras, London
Cricketers from Greater London
British emigrants to New Zealand
New Zealand public servants